The Ken McKenzie Trophy was awarded annually to the Central Hockey League's leading points scorer in the regular season. The award was named for Ken McKenzie, the co-founder and longtime president and publisher of The Hockey News.

Previously, the award was used by the Central Hockey League (1963-84) as their rookie of the year award, as selected by the CHL coaches. It was known simply as the Rookie of the Year award until the 1977-78 season.

CPHL/CHL Rookie of the Year (1964 - 1984)

Winners (1993 - 2014)

Central Professional Hockey League trophies and awards
Central Hockey League trophies and awards